The Ländler is a folk dance in  time which was popular in Austria, Bavaria, German Switzerland, and Slovenia at the end of the 18th century.

It is a partner dance which strongly features hopping and stamping. It might be purely instrumental or have a vocal part, sometimes featuring yodeling.

When dance halls became popular in Europe in the 19th century, the Ländler was made quicker and more elegant, and the men shed the hobnail boots which they wore to dance it. Along with a number of other folk dances from Germany and Bohemia, it is thought to have influenced the development of the waltz.

A number of classical composers wrote or included Ländler in their music, including Ludwig van Beethoven, Franz Schubert and Anton Bruckner. In several of his symphonies, Gustav Mahler replaced the menuet with a Ländler. The Carinthian folk tune quoted in Alban Berg's Violin Concerto is a Ländler, and another features in Act II of his opera Wozzeck. The "German Dances" of Wolfgang Amadeus Mozart and Joseph Haydn also resemble Ländler. Josef Lanner (1801–1843) wrote several Ländlers. It was he—along with Johann Strauss I and Johann Strauss II—that helped popularize the waltz in Vienna and elsewhere. The Johann Strauss II waltz Tales from the Vienna Woods features a zither playing in the style of a Ländler. Britten's Peter Grimes features a Ländler in the scene where a dance night is occurring in the Hall.

The Sound of Music Broadway musical, the film, as well as the American and British live TV broadcasts (The Sound of Music Live! (2013) and The Sound of Music Live (2015)) all feature a scene where the protagonists Maria and Captain von Trapp dance a Ländler. The instrumental tune used in that sequence is a  time re-arrangement of the more polka-like "The Lonely Goatherd" when Bil Baird's puppets are no longer needed and therefore aren't seen for the rest of the film. Compare this one to the "Dornbacher" Ländler by Lanner, and one will hear many similarities. The choreographers for the motion picture researched the traditional Austrian folk dance and integrated it into the choreography of the Ländler danced in the film. The same (The Sound of Music) Ländler is played by 2 or 3 zithers, during the rehearsal for the Salzburg Music Festival as well.

See also
 Austrian folk dances
 Austrian folk dancing
 Fandango
 Mazurka
 Music of Austria
 Polonaise (dance)
 Polska (dance)
 Schuhplattler
 Waltz
 Zwiefacher

References

External links
 Analysis of Schubert's Seventeen Ländler by pianist Bart Berman

European dances
German folk dances
Swiss folk dances
Austrian folk dances
Dance forms in classical music